Driss El Khouri (1939 – 14 February 2022) was a Moroccan novelist who was one of the most acclaimed in the country.

Life and career
El Khouri's books convey strongly the feel of everyday Moroccan life in coffee shops and other urban settings and show a firm commitment to representing the voices of marginalized members of society.

The poetry festival in Rabat in 2004 was held in honour of El Khouri.

El Khouri died at his home in Salé on 14 February 2022, at the age of 83.

Novels
Al-Bidayat (Beginnings) (1980),
Al-’ayyam wa Allayali (Days and Nights) (1982)
Madinat Atturab (City of Dirt) (1988).

External links (both in French)
 Hommage to Driss el Khouri at the festival in Rabat (2004)
 Hommage to Driss el Khouri by the Institut du monde Arabe in Paris

Bibliography
 Le Monde,  2 October 2003: Driss El Khoury fait bonne figure en Italie (Festival de la littérature méditerraéenne)

References

1939 births
2022 deaths
Moroccan novelists
Moroccan male writers
Male novelists
Moroccan male short story writers
Moroccan short story writers
20th-century novelists
20th-century short story writers
20th-century male writers
20th-century Moroccan writers
People from Casablanca